Ɗugwor is a Chadic language spoken in northern Cameroon. Blench (2006) considers Mikere dialect to be a separate language.

The Dugwor have historically lived in two small massifs known as Dugwor and Mékéri, located in the south of Mayo-Ranéo. They now inhabit the neighboring plain of Tchakidjeke (west of Tchéré canton, Méri commune, Diamaré department, Far North region). They are part of the Mofu ethnic group; their neighbors call them Mofu-Dugwor.

Notes 

Biu-Mandara languages
Languages of Cameroon